Škoda 31Tr SOR is a low-floor articulated trolleybus produced in cooperation of Škoda Transportation (electrical equipment and assembly) and SOR, which supplies the body based on the bus SOR NB 18.

Construction features 
31Tr is derived from SOR NB 18 city bus. It is made of two rigid sections linked by a pivoting joint. Electric motor is located in the rear of the bus. Inside are used plastic Ster seats. Rear axle is VOITH brand, as well as medium axle, the front axle is own production with independent wheel suspension. Only rear C axle is propulsed. Body of the vehicle is welded from steel-voltage profiles, flashings from the outside and interior are lined with plastic sheeting. The floor of the bus is at a height of 360 mm above the ground. On the right side of the bus are five doors (first are narrower than other doors).

Production and operation 
Production started in 2011.
In Czech and Slovak cities they replaced old high-floor trolleybuses Škoda 15Tr

References

External links 
 Trolleybus 31 Tr, skoda.cz

Articulated buses
Buses of the Czech Republic
Buses manufactured by SOR
Trolleybuses
Škoda vehicles